Igor Pirekeyev (Игорь Пирекеев; born May 16, 1971 in Ashgabat, Turkmen SSR) is a former Turkmenistani and current Kazakh shooter and two-time gold medalist at the Asian Games. He also competed for Turkmenistan at the Summer Olympics in 1996, 2000 and 2004. At the 2000 Olympics, Pirekeyev qualified for the final round of the men's 50 metre rifle prone event and finished in seventh place.

References

1971 births
Living people
Sportspeople from Ashgabat
Turkmenistan male sport shooters
Kazakhstani male sport shooters
Turkmenistan emigrants to Kazakhstan
Shooters at the 1996 Summer Olympics
Shooters at the 2000 Summer Olympics
Shooters at the 2004 Summer Olympics
Olympic shooters of Turkmenistan
Asian Games medalists in shooting
Shooters at the 1994 Asian Games
Shooters at the 1998 Asian Games
Shooters at the 2002 Asian Games
Shooters at the 2006 Asian Games
Shooters at the 2010 Asian Games
Shooters at the 2014 Asian Games
Asian Games gold medalists for Turkmenistan
Asian Games silver medalists for Turkmenistan
Asian Games silver medalists for Kazakhstan
Asian Games bronze medalists for Kazakhstan
Medalists at the 1998 Asian Games
Medalists at the 2002 Asian Games
Medalists at the 2006 Asian Games
Medalists at the 2010 Asian Games
Medalists at the 2014 Asian Games